Medford Municipal Airport  is a city-owned, public-use airport located one nautical mile (2 km) southwest of the central business district of Medford, a city in Grant County, Oklahoma, United States. It is included in the National Plan of Integrated Airport Systems for 2011–2015, which categorized it as a general aviation facility.

Facilities and aircraft 
Medford Municipal Airport covers an area of 127 acres (51 ha) at an elevation of 1,092 feet (333 m) above mean sea level. It has one runway designated 17/35 with an asphalt surface measuring 3,007 by 60 feet (917 x 18 m).

For the 12-month period ending February 17, 2009, the airport had 1,000 general aviation aircraft operations, an average of 83 per month. At that time there were 14 aircraft based at this airport, all single-engine.

References

External links 
 Medford Municipal Airport (O53) at Oklahoma Aeronautics Commission
 Aerial image as of February 1995 from USGS The National Map
 
 

Airports in Oklahoma
Grant County, Oklahoma